Arthur Hoffmann (19 June 1857, in St. Gallen – 23 July 1927, in St. Gallen) was a Swiss politician and member of the Swiss Federal Council (1911–1917).

Hoffmann was the son of Karl Hoffmann (1820–1895), who declined his election to the Swiss Federal Council in 1881.

Arthur Hoffmann was elected to the Federal Council on 4 April 1911 and resigned on 19 June 1917 as a result of the Grimm–Hoffmann Affair which seriously questioned Switzerland's neutrality during World War I.

He was affiliated to the Free Democratic Party.

During Hoffmann's office time he held the following departments:
 Department of Justice and Police (1911)
 Military Department (1912–1913)
 Political Department (1914–1917)
Hoffmann was President of the Confederation in 1914.

References

External links

1857 births
1927 deaths
People from St. Gallen (city)
Swiss Calvinist and Reformed Christians
Free Democratic Party of Switzerland politicians
Members of the Federal Council (Switzerland)
Members of the Council of States (Switzerland)
Presidents of the Council of States (Switzerland)
University of Geneva alumni
Foreign ministers of Switzerland